Haiti is a Caribbean country  roughly three-eighths of the island of Hispaniola and includes many small islands.

Haiti may also refer to: 

 "Haiti", a song by Arcade Fire from the 2004 album Funeral
 "Haiti I Am Sorry", or simply "Haiti", a 1988 calypso song by David Rudder
 Little Haiti, also known as La Petite Haïti, a center for Haitian immigrants in Florida
 Republic of Haiti (1806–1820)
 Republic of Haiti (1820–1849)
 Republic of Haiti (1859–1957)
 SS Haiti (1932), a passenger and freight ship
 Team Haiti, a former American Basketball Association team

See also
 Hati (disambiguation)
 Hiati, a village in Iran
 Empire of Haiti (disambiguation)
 Hai Ti!, a Namibian educational comic strip
 Haitia, a small genus of two species in the Loosestrife family of plants that is named for Haiti
 Haitian (disambiguation)
 Hayti (disambiguation)